Sanzharovka is a rural locality (a village) in Alkinsky Selsoviet, Chishminsky District, Bashkortostan, Russia. The population was 159 as of 2010. There are 9 streets.

Geography 
Sanzharovka is located 10 km northeast of Chishmy (the district's administrative centre) by road. Zavodyanka is the nearest rural locality.

References 

Rural localities in Chishminsky District